Spencer Wilshire (born 1945) is a former Welsh international lawn and indoor bowler.

Bowls career
He won a silver medal in the pairs with Lyn Perkins at the 1982 Commonwealth Games in Brisbane.

He was the Welsh National singles champion in 1978. and the pairs champion on four occasions in 1975, 1978, 1980 and 1995.

References

1945 births
Welsh male bowls players
Bowls players at the 1982 Commonwealth Games
Commonwealth Games silver medallists for Wales
Commonwealth Games medallists in lawn bowls
Living people
Medallists at the 1982 Commonwealth Games